Aaron Smith (born ) is a professional rugby league footballer who plays as a  for the Leigh Leopards in the Betfred Super League.

He has spent time on loan from St Helens at the York City Knights in Betfred League 1, Hull Kingston Rovers in the Super League, and Featherstone Rovers and the Leigh Centurions in the Betfred Championship.

Background
Smith was born in Newton-le-Willows, Merseyside, England.

Career
In 2018 he made his Super League début on loan for Hull Kingston Rovers against Wakefield Trinity.
In 2018 he has spent time on loan at Featherstone Rovers. He played in the 2019 Super League Grand Final victory over the Salford Red Devils at Old Trafford.

Leigh Centurions (loan)
On 22 October 2021, it was reported that he had re-joined Leigh in the RFL Championship on a season-long loan.

References

External links
St Helens profile
Saints Heritage Society profile
SL profile

1996 births
Living people
England Knights national rugby league team players
English rugby league players
Featherstone Rovers players
Hull Kingston Rovers players
Leigh Leopards players
Rugby league hookers
Rugby league players from St Helens, Merseyside
St Helens R.F.C. players
York City Knights players